Lapet is a 2019 Gujarati family comedy-drama film directed by Nishith Brambhatt and produced by Apurva Joshi under the banner of Apurva Joshi Entertainment. The film has an ensemble of Nayan Shukla, Ketan Kumar Sagar, Vikee Shah, Bhakti Kubavat, Prashant Barot, Sharad Sharma, Kalyani Thakar, Jignesh Modi, Anand Devmani, Manish Vaghela and Mehul Maurya. The film was released by Rupam Entertainment Pvt Ltd on 15 February 2019.

Cast 
Nayan Shukla as Chandrakant 
 Ketan Kumar Sagar as ChandanSinh
 Vikee Shah as Chandu The Real Don 
Bhakti Kubavat as Mausam
Prashant Barot as Bhanu Pratap
 Sharad Sharma as RudraPratap
Kalyani Thakar as Madhu
Jignesh Modi as Boss

Production
The film was produced by Apurva Joshi from Apurva Joshi Entertainment. The Direction and story were by Nishith Brahmbhatt. Jigardan Gadhavi is music director of the film, Arvind Vegda has sung the title track of the film. The film was shot in Ahmedabad under the production of Apurva Joshi Entertainment.

Soundtrack

Release
The trailer and music of the film were released in public event on 12 January 2019 and on digital platform on 21 January 2019 on Shemaroo Entertainment. The film was released on 15 February 2019.

References

External links
 

2019 films
Films set in Ahmedabad
Films shot in Ahmedabad
Films shot in Gujarat
Indian comedy-drama films
2010s Gujarati-language films